David Edwards may refer to:

Music
David "Honeyboy" Edwards (1915–2011), American blues singer and guitarist
Dave Edwards (musician) (1941–2000), American musician
David Edwards (singer) (active since 1982), Welsh musician
David Eugene Edwards (born 1968), American musician; lead singer of Woven Hand and 16 Horsepower
Minotaur Shock, stage name of David Edwards, British electronica musician

Sports
David Edwards (Cambridgeshire cricketer) (1805–1850), English cricketer
David Farragut Edwards (c. 1872–1930), American football coach
Dai Edwards (1896–1960), Wales dual-code rugby international
Dave Edwards (Scottish footballer) (1900–1946), early twentieth century association football goalkeeper
David Edwards (rugby union) (1930–2006), Scottish rugby union player
David Edwards (footballer, born 1934), Welsh footballer
Dave Edwards (linebacker) (1939–2016), NFL linebacker
Dave Edwards (baseball) (born 1954), former MLB player
David Edwards (golfer) (born 1956), American PGA Tour and Champions Tour player
Dave Edwards (defensive back) (born 1962), NFL defensive back
David Edwards (sailor) (born 1973), Australian sailor
David Edwards (footballer, born 1974), English footballer
David Edwards (curler) (born 1979), Scottish curler
David Edwards (cricketer, born 1980), English cricketer
David Edwards (footballer, born 1986), Wales international footballer
David Edwards (motivational speaker) (1987–2008), American footballer and speaker
David Edwards (cyclist) (born 1993), Australian cyclist
David Edwards (offensive lineman) (born 1997), American football offensive lineman
David Edwards (basketball) (1971–2020), American basketball player

Other
David Edwards (minister) (1660–1716), Welsh independent minister who lived in the Vale of Aeron
David Edwards (soldier) (1841–1897), American soldier who fought in the American Civil War
David Edwards (judge) (1871–1936), Australian judge
David Miall Edwards (1873–1941), Welsh Non-conformist writer and theologian
David Edwards (priest) (1929–2018), English Anglican Dean of Norwich
Dave Edwards (Wyoming politician) (1938–2013), American politician
David Edwards (quiz contestant) (born 1947), Welsh game show winner
David Edwards (engineer), American biomedical engineering professor, writer and experimental artist
David Edwards (journalist) (born 1962), British political writer
David Edwards (Oregon politician) (born 1966), member of the Oregon State House of Representatives
David Edwards (bishop), Anglican bishop of Fredericton, Canada

See also
David Edward (born 1934), Scottish lawyer and academic
David Edwardes (fl. 1529–1532), English anatomist